Oh, Whiskers! is a 1913 silent short film directed by Phillips Smalley and starring Pearl White. It was produced by the Crystal Film Company and released through Universal Film Manufacturing Company. It was released in split-reel for with Pearl as a Detective.

The film is preserved at the Library of Congress.

Cast
Pearl White - Miss Hegg
Chester Barnett - The Barber
Joseph Belmont -  Baldwin

References

External links
Oh, Whiskers! at IMDb.com

1913 films
American silent short films
American black-and-white films
1913 short films
1913 comedy films
American comedy short films
Silent American comedy films
1910s American films